According to Jim is an American sitcom television series starring Jim Belushi in the title role as a suburban father of three children (and then five children, starting with the seventh season finale). It originally ran on ABC from October 3, 2001 to June 2, 2009.

Synopsis 

Jim is a happy-go-lucky suburban father. Much like his real-life counterpart, Jim's character is a fan of blues music, as well as the Chicago Bears, Chicago Cubs, Chicago Bulls and Chicago Blackhawks. Together with his wife Cheryl, they have three children, daughters Ruby and Gracie and son Kyle. In the seventh season they become parents of twin boys Gordon and Jonathan.

Jim often finds himself in difficult situations, because his slacker sensibilities cause him to search for alternative ways to get things done with less effort. While Cheryl's brother Andy is Jim's best friend/brother-in-law, her sister Dana frequently teams up with Cheryl against Jim. He also prefers to lie to Cheryl and Dana to do his own activities but they end up backfiring on him. He hates losing to women, especially if Cheryl or Dana find out. He doesn't like people interrupting him when he talks, so he speaks over them to shut them up. Jim often makes an example of Andy, who for most of the series does not have a steady girlfriend. Dana and Jim argue constantly, but Dana flirts with Jim when she's drunk, discovering after one such event that she respects Jim as a loving father despite his flaws.

Episodes

Cast and characters

Main and recurring cast 

 Jim Belushi as James "Jim" Orenthal (seasons 1–8): the titular role of the series. Jim is a suburban family man, successful construction business owner (Ground Up Design), and blues garage band frontman. In his stubborn ways, Jim gets himself into various predicaments, which compel him to solve in creative ways, all while battling his own conscience. Despite his best efforts, Jim ultimately admits his wrong-doings to Cheryl and others involved. Shenanigans aside, Jim is happily married to his loving wife, Cheryl. Jim and Cheryl's three children (Ruby, Gracie and Kyle) complement the family dynamic through the series' run. At the end of season 7, Cheryl gives birth to the series' identical twin sons, Johnathan and Gordon.
 Jim is an avid Chicago sports enthusiast. In numerous episodes, Jim is seen watching Chicago Bears football games in his living room. In season 4's "Poking the Bear" episode, Jim shows his disdain for other football teams when his potential client takes him to a Green Bay Packers game.
 He enjoys playing harmonica and fronting his garage band. In various episodes, he and his band practice in the garage, except when Cheryl takes over the garage with a yoga class in season 2's "The Closet" episode, forcing Jim and the band to practice in the attic.
 Courtney Thorne-Smith as Cheryl Mabel (seasons 1–8): Jim's wife, as well as Dana and Andy's older sister
 Kimberly Williams-Paisley as Dana (seasons 1–7; special guest season 8): Cheryl's younger sister. Dana is a vice president for a marketing company and prides herself at being good at her job. She often sides with her sister, Cheryl, during family quarrels.
 Larry Joe Campbell as Andy (seasons 1–8): Cheryl's younger brother. Andy is a Standford University graduate and works for Jim as an architect at their construction company, Ground Up Design. He often sides with Jim during family squabbles. He is a sci-fi enthusiast who collects video games, Nerf guns, DVD movies, board games, and comic books (as seen in season 6's "Separate Ways"). Andy considers himself to be a "lady's man", but his pick-up lines don't bring many long-term relationships.
 Taylor Atelian as Ruby (seasons 1–8): Jim and Cheryl's first child. Like her mother, Cheryl, Ruby is a leader amongst her siblings.
 Billi Bruno as Gracie (seasons 1–8): Jim and Cheryl's second child. Gracie often sides with Ruby during sibling rivalries against Kyle.
 Conner Rayburn as Kyle (seasons 4–8): Jim and Cheryl's third child. Kyle is not particularly interested in sports and finds it difficult to connect with his father on the topic.
 Mitch Rouse as Dr. Ryan "Doc" Gibson (recurring seasons 4–6; guest season 8): Cheryl's doctor in season 4's "Poking the Bear" episode. Ryan later becomes Dana's boyfriend, the two eventually marry, and have 1 child together.

Other appearances 

 Tony Braunagel as Tony (seasons 1–8): A member of Jim's band
 Connor and Garret Sullivan as baby Kyle (seasons 1–3)
 John Rubano as John (seasons 1–8): A member of Jim's band
 Charlie Hartsock as Charlie (seasons 3–8): A member of Jim's band
 Robert Belushi as Pizza boy / adult Kyle / Various (seasons 1–6, 8)
 Mark Beltzman as Beltzman (seasons 3–4, 6): A member of Jim's band
 Christopher Moniyhan as Chris (seasons 1–2): A member of Jim's band
 Jamison Belushi as Various (seasons 5–8)
 Dan Aykroyd as Danny Michalski (seasons 1–3, 8): Jim's long-time friend and police officer
 Kathleen Noone as Maggie (seasons 1–2, 4–5): Cheryl, Dana and Andy's mother
 Jackie Debatin as Mandy (season 8): Ruby's piano teacher. Later, Andy's girlfriend.
 Cynthia Stevenson as Cindy Devlin (seasons 2–4, 6): Cheryl's obnoxious soccer-mom friend
 Tim Bagley as Tim Devlin (seasons 2–4, 6): Cindy's husband
 Mo Collins as Emily (seasons 7–8): Andy's girlfriend
 Chris Elliott as Reverend Pierson (seasons 2–3)
 Brad Paisley as Eddie (season 2): Dana's boyfriend and Andy's replacement on keyboards for a gig. He also portrays Chad (season 2) in the episodes "You Gotta Love Somebody (Parts 1 & 2)".
 Laraine Newman as Officer Laraine Elkin (seasons 2–3): Danny's police officer partner
 Jennifer Coolidge as Roxanne (seasons 2–3): Jim's estranged sister
 Erik Estrada as Himself (season 5). He also portrays the Devil (season 8) in the episode "Heaven Opposed to Hell".
 Lee Majors as God (seasons 7–8)
 Nicole Sullivan as Alicia (season 1): Ruby's piano teacher and Andy's girlfriend
 Brian Urlacher as Himself (season 1)
 Cindy Crawford as Gretchen Saunders (season 2): A seductive female manager at a car dealership in "Cars & Chicks"
 Mike Ditka as Himself (season 2)
 Trista Sutter as Herself (season 2)
 Bo Diddley as Himself (season 2)
 Jack Coleman as Sean Curran (season 2)
 Wayne Newton as Himself (season 2)
 Jane Lynch as Janice (season 3): Jim and Cheryl's neighbor 
 Tom Bergeron as Himself (season 3)
 James Earl Jones as the voice of Royal Flush (season 3): A stainless steel talking toilet
 Dave Coulier as the voice of Angry Pete (season 4): A psychotic turkey in "The Hunters"
 Tom Arnold as Max (season 4): A Green Bay Packers fan and Jim's potential client
 Hugh Hefner as Himself (season 5)
 Linda Hamilton as Melissa Evans (season 5): Jim's former girlfrield
 Barry Williams as Ben (season 5)
 Julie Newmar as Herself (season 5)
 Tim Meadows as Dennis (season 6)
 George Takei as Himself (season 6)
 Phil LaMarr as Kurt (season 6)
 Cole Sprouse as Himself (season 7)
 Dylan Sprouse as Himself (season 7)
 Steve Guttenberg as Himself (season 8)
 Rob Moran as Director (season 8)
 Constance Marie as Victoria (season 8): Jim's former girlfriend
 James Lipton as The Devil (season 7)

Production

Development 
According to Jim was created by Tracy Newman and Jonathan Stark. The sitcom was produced by ABC's in-house production company and Newman/Stark, Suzanne Bukinik Entertainment and Brad Grey Television. The series was filmed at the CBS Studio Center in Los Angeles.

Belushi, besides playing Jim, directed 30 episodes and is credited as executive producer.

Belushi's fictional character Jim'''s band in the series is the real-life House of Blues band The Sacred Hearts, for which Jim Belushi often sings lead.

 Influences 
Belushi says he set the show's trademark tone back in the show's 2001 pilot.

"The original script called for Jim to go to the wife and apologize," he recalls. "I said to the writers, 'Why do we have to do a show where the guy is going to apologize at the end of every episode? Was he really wrong? He's contrite, sure. But isn't he just being a man?'"

In an interview, Jim Belushi explained that the show many times directly reflected his actual life. Quite a few episodes were experiences taken directly from Belushi's home. Most of the episodes were taken from experiences inside the writers' homes, too. He adds:

"Every show is based in somebody's reality. Whether it's [co-stars] Larry's, or mine, or Courtney's, or the writers'. Because it was a relationship show about a family, everyone would bring in their experiences as a family, and we would do shows around them."

 Family names 
Last names were never really addressed for the entire run of the show. None of the main characters did get a last name until Season 4 when Kimberly Williams-Paisley's character Dana married Dr. Ryan Gibson (played by Mitch Rouse). She became Dana Gibson with their marriage. Only guest characters had first and last names in most cases.

 Music 
The According to Jim soundtrack was recorded at Ultratone Studies in Studio City, California and released by Hollywood Records on November 1, 2005.

 Track listing 
All songs are performed by Jim Belushi and The Sacred Hearts.

 Release 
 Broadcast 
The show first aired following the surprise hit comedy My Wife and Kids and quickly developed an audience of its own. For its second season ABC placed it on its revitalized Tuesday line-up, which also included John Ritter's 8 Simple Rules, Bonnie Hunt's Life with Bonnie and Sara Rue's Less Than Perfect. Week by week, the show attracted more and more viewers, becoming ABC's second most watched sitcom. The show performed so well that the network made a risky move: putting Jim opposite the NBC juggernaut Frasier. Although Jim did not beat the competition, it performed well enough to secure itself that spot on the 2003 fall schedule.

On May 15, 2007, ABC announced that According to Jim would not be renewed for another season. ABC Entertainment President Stephen McPherson said, "We are talking to the studio to see if there's something financially, a deal that would make sense for us."  But on June 27, 2007, ABC renewed the show for a seventh season with 18 episodes.According to Jim returned to ABC's schedule on Tuesday, January 1, 2008, with two episodes at 9 pm and 9:30 pm. After that, the series moved to its regular time slot at 8 pm. Despite the writer's strike, ABC announced that the show would produce all 18 episodes ordered for this season.

On February 27, 2008, it was reported that ABC was close to renewing According to Jim for an eighth season. On May 13, 2008, ABC officially renewed the series and Season 8 began airing on December 2, 2008. Kimberly Williams-Paisley left the show's regular cast at the beginning of Season 8 and was not in the Season 8 opening credits, to devote her time to motherhood. She made a guest appearance only in the season finale.

In December 2008, co-star Larry Joe Campbell said that the sets had been destroyed, indicating that the series was canceled, but that a series finale had been recorded. After the first six episodes of Season 8 all aired in December, According to Jim returned to ABC's schedule on April 14, 2009, for the final 12 episodes.
The series finale of According to Jim aired on June 2, 2009, on ABC, and was titled "Heaven Opposed to Hell."

 Home media 
Lionsgate Home Entertainment (under license from ABC Studios) has released the first five seasons on DVD in Region 1.

 Reception 
 Ratings 
The sitcom debuted in 2001 on ABC with an average of 10 million viewers for its first year. The audience grew in the second year to over 10.3 million. The ratings remained consistent for Seasons 3 and 4 as well. Starting with Season 5, the ratings began to decline. The series was often scheduled against the hugely successful American Idol. By Season 6, According to Jim was down to 6.7 million viewers.

Seasonal rankings (based on average total viewers per episode) of According to Jim on ABC.Note: Each U.S. network television season starts in late September and ends in late May, which coincides with the completion of May sweeps. Accolades According to Jim'' was nominated for 20 awards, including four Primetime Emmy Awards (all for cinematography).

Notes

References

External links 

Nydaiynews.com

2000s American sitcoms
2001 American television series debuts
2009 American television series endings
American Broadcasting Company original programming
English-language television shows
Television series about families
Television series about marriage
Television series about siblings
Television series by ABC Studios
Television shows set in Chicago